The fifth series of the ITV1 television series Benidorm, which is a sitcom set in an all-inclusive holiday resort (The Solana) in Benidorm, Spain, began broadcasting on 24 February 2012, consisting of seven episodes. The series was directed by both John Henderson and Sandy Johnson, though was written by Derren Litten, Steve Pemberton and Neil Fitzmaurice. The series saw the returns of Garvey family, consisting of Mick (Steve Pemberton), Janice (Siobhan Finneran), Michael Garvey (Oliver Stokes) and Janice's mother Madge Barron (Sheila Reid); swingers Donald (Kenny Ireland) and Jacqueline Stewart (Janine Duvitski); Noreen Maltby (Elsie Kelly); hairdressers Gavin Ramsbottom (Hugh Sachs) and Kenneth Du Beke (Tony Maudsley); Sam Wood (Shelley Longworth) and Solana staff Mateo Castellanos (Jake Canuso), Les/Lesley Conroy (Tim Healy) and Liam Conroy (Adam Gillen). Sherrie Hewson and Michelle Butterly joined the cast of Joyce Temple-Savage, the new Solana manageress, and Trudy, the new holiday companion of Sam, respectively. Paul Bazely, Kathryn Drysdale and Selina Griffiths did not return; Crissy Rock did not return either, though did make a brief return during the sixth episode.

Initially, Litten did not want to write a fifth series, believing that the fourth series had allowed the programme to conclude on a high. However, due to popular demand, he agreed to write further episodes, with cast member Steve Pemberton, as well as Neil Fitzmaurice, agreeing to help him write episodes and storylines. Overall, the series received an average viewership of 7.06 million, with the opening episode receiving 6.84 million viewers. The series concluded on 6 April 2012, with the series finale attracting 5.66 million.

Cast 
 Sheila Reid as Madge Harvey
 Siobhan Finneran as Janice Garvey
 Oliver Stokes as Michael Garvey
 Steve Pemberton as Mick Garvey (episodes 2–7)
 Janine Duvitski as Jacqueline Stewart 
 Kenny Ireland as Donald Stewart
 Jake Canuso as Mateo Castellanos 
 Elsie Kelly as Noreen Maltby
 Hugh Sachs as Gavin Ramsbottom
 Tim Healy as Les/Lesley Conroy
 Adam Gillen as Liam Conroy
 Tony Maudsley as Kenneth Du Beke
 Shelley Longworth as Sam Wood
 Sherrie Hewson as Joyce Temple-Savage
 Michelle Butterly as Trudy
 Crissy Rock as Janey York (episode 6)

Episodes

Ratings

References

Notes

External links
 Series 5 – list of episodes on IMDb

5